The Wendish People's Party was a political party of the Sorbs in Weimar Germany from 1919 to 1933. It was led by Jakub Lorenc-Zalěski during its entire existence.

History
The party was originally known as the Lusatian People's Party (Lausitzer Volkspartei). It ran in the 1920 federal elections, but received just 0.03% of the vote and failed to win a seat. By the May 1924 elections the party had changed its name to the Wendish People's Party. It ran as part of the National Minorities Alliance, but again failed to win a seat, receiving just 0.04% of the national vote.

The December 1924 elections saw the party's vote share halve to 0.02%, whilst in the 1928 elections it again saw a fall in popular support, receiving just 3,111 votes. The party did not contest any further elections.

A new party under the same name was founded in 2005, changing its name to the Lusatian Alliance in 2010.

References

Political parties in the Weimar Republic
Political parties of minorities in Germany
1919 establishments in Germany
1933 disestablishments in Germany
Political parties established in 1919
Political parties disestablished in 1933